Mogonye is a village in the Southern District of Botswana. In the 2011 census, it had a population of 577.

References 

Villages in Botswana